Orbest Orizonia Airlines served the following destinations (as of December 2012):

Americas

Antigua and Barbuda
 V. C. Bird International Airport

Dominican Republic
 Punta Cana International Airport

Mexico
 Cancún International Airport

Trinidad and Tobago
 Piarco International Airport

Europe
Portugal
 Lisbon Portela Airport - seasonal charter
 Francisco Sa Carneiro Airport - seasonal charter
Spain Spain
 Alicante Airport
 Bilbao Airport
 Lanzarote Airport
 Madrid-Barajas Airport - seasonal base
 Oviedo - Asturias Airport
 Palma de Mallorca - Son Sant Joan Airport - base
 Santiago de Compostela Airport
Tenerife
Tenerife North Airport
Tenerife South Airport
 Valencia Airport
 Valladolid Airport
 Vigo-Peinador Airport
 Zaragoza Airport

References

Orbest Orizonia Airlines